A 2012 special election in Arizona's 8th congressional district was held on June 12, with primary elections held on April 17, to fill a seat in the United States House of Representatives for Arizona's 8th congressional district until the 112th United States Congress ends on January 3, 2013. The election was caused by the resignation of Representative Gabby Giffords on January 25, 2012, to concentrate on recovering from her injuries from the 2011 Tucson shooting. The seat was won by Ron Barber, a former aide to Giffords who was wounded in the attempt on her life.

Background 
Governor of Arizona Jan Brewer announced April 17 to be the date for the special primary elections and June 12 for the special general election.

Democratic primary

Candidates

Declared
 Ron Barber, Giffords' District Director

Withdrew
 Matt Heinz, state representative

Declined
 Paula Aboud, Arizona Senate Whip.
 John Adams, retired Brigadier General
 David Crowe, software company owner
 Steve Farley, Arizona House of Representatives
 Jeff Latas, former vice chair of the Arizona Democratic Party and 2006 primary candidate
 Linda J. Lopez, state senator
 Janet Napolitano, former Governor of Arizona and United States Secretary of Homeland Security
 Daniel Patterson, state representative
 Tim Sultan, program chair of the Democrats of Greater Tucson and 2004 primary candidate
 Ramon Valadez, Pima County, Arizona Supervisor
 Nan Stockholm Walden, Farmer Investments VP and former chief of staff to Senator Bill Bradley
 Bruce Wheeler, state representative

Results

Republican primary

Candidates

Declared
 Frank Antenori, state senator and Iraq War veteran
 Jesse Kelly, Iraq War veteran and 2010 Republican nominee
 Martha McSally, U.S. Air Force colonel, first female USAF air combat pilot
 Dave Sitton, businessman, broadcaster, and coach

Declined
 Jonathan Paton, state senator and 2010 primary candidate

Results

General election
The following candidates were on the ballot: 
 Ron Barber, (Democrat), small business owner and Giffords' District Director
 Jesse Kelly (Republican), Iraq War veteran and 2010 Republican nominee

Polling

With McSally

Results

See also
List of special elections to the United States House of Representatives

References

External links
 Ron Barber campaign site
 Jesse Kelly campaign site

United States House of Representatives 8
Arizona 8
2012 8
Arizona 2012 8
Arizona 8
United States House of Representatives 2012 8
Arizona 8